John Milton Miller (22 June 1882 – 17 May 1962) was a noted American electrical engineer, best known for discovering the Miller effect and inventing fundamental circuits for quartz crystal oscillators (Miller oscillators).

Miller was born in Hanover, Pennsylvania.  In 1904 he graduated from Yale University, in 1907 he received an M.A. from Yale, and in 1915 he received his Ph.D. in Physics from Yale. From 190719 he was a physicist with the National Bureau of Standards, then a radio engineer at the United States Navy's Radio Laboratory (191923) in Anacostia, District of Columbia, and subsequently at the Naval Research Laboratory (NRL). From 192536 he led radio receiver research at the Atwater Kent Manufacturing Company, Philadelphia, and from 193640 was assistant head of the research laboratory for the RCA Radiotron Company. In 1940 he returned to NRL where he became superintendent of Radio I Division (1945), associate director of research (1951), and scientific research administrator (1952). He married Frances Riley; the couple had seven children — two girls and five boys.

Miller was awarded the Distinguished Civilian Service Award in 1945 for "initiation of the development of a new flexible radio-frequency cable urgently needed in radio and radar equipment which solved a desperate material shortage in the United States during World War II," and the IRE Medal of Honor in 1953 for "his pioneering contributions to our basic knowledge of electron tube theory, of radio instruments and measurements, and of crystal controlled oscillators."

References 

 IEEE History Center biography
John M. Miller, Dependence of the input impedance of a three-electrode vacuum tube upon the load in the plate circuit, Scientific Papers of the Bureau of Standards, 15(351):367-385, 1920.
John M. Miller, "Electrical oscillations in antennas and inductance coils", Proc. IRE, vol. 7, pp. 299–326, June 1919.

1882 births
1962 deaths
American electronics engineers
IEEE Medal of Honor recipients
Radio pioneers
Yale University alumni
People from Hanover, Pennsylvania
United States Navy civilians
Engineers from Pennsylvania